N. D. Venkatachalam is an Indian politician and Ex-minister & EX-member of the Tamil Nadu Legislative Assembly from the Perundurai constituency. He was refused party ticket in 2021 General election, so he contested as Independent candidate and lost. He was a member of Anna Dravida Munnetra Kazhagam party and now expelled from the party.

He joined Dravida Munnetra Kazhagam party on 11 July 2021, in the presence of Chief Minister M. K. Stalin.

References 

All India Anna Dravida Munnetra Kazhagam politicians
Living people
State cabinet ministers of Tamil Nadu
1964 births
Tamil Nadu MLAs 2011–2016
Tamil Nadu MLAs 2016–2021